N. lutea may refer to:

 Napoleonaea lutea, a woody plant
 Nauclea lutea, a tree with glossy leaves
 Nelima lutea, a daddy longlegs
 Nelumbo lutea, an aquatic plant
 Neoeromene lutea, a grass moth
 Neptunia lutea, a perennial plant
 Nomada lutea, a cuckoo bee
 Nudaurelia lutea, a large moth
 Nuphar lutea, an aquatic plant